Herger is a surname. Notable people with the surname include:

 Albert Herger (1942–2009), Swiss racing cyclist
 Alfred D. Herger (born 1942), Puerto Rican television presenter and psychologist
 Wally Herger (born 1945), American politician

See also
 Berger